Peter Michael Swanwick (born 10 December 1945) is a former English cricketer.  Swanwick was a right-handed batsman who fielded as a wicket-keeper.  He was born in Rocester, Staffordshire.

Swanwick made his debut for Staffordshire in the 1967 Minor Counties Championship against the Lancashire Second XI.  Swanwick played Minor counties cricket for Staffordshire from 1967 to 1971, which included 39 Minor Counties Championship matches.  In 1971, he made his only List A appearance against Glamorgan in the Gillette Cup.  In this match, he scored a single unbeaten run, with Staffordshire losing by 77 runs.

References

External links
Peter Swanwick at ESPNcricinfo
Peter Swanwick at CricketArchive

1945 births
Living people
People from Rocester
English cricketers
Staffordshire cricketers
Wicket-keepers